Bonafide is a Swedish hard rock band, formed by singer/guitarist Pontus Snibb in Malmö in 2006. Releasing their eponymous debut album the following year and playing two shows at the Sweden Rock Festival in 2008, as well as opening for bands like Deep Purple, Quireboys, and Status Quo, quickly brought them a nationwide audience. Their most well-known song, Fill Your Head With Rock, was written for the aforementioned festival, and has since been named as one of 2011's best songs by Classic Rock Magazine.  Snibb, Ekelund and Matsson are also members of Mustasch.

History

Formation 

Pontus Snibb had played blues and rock for several years; toured and made records with bands such as Mescaleros, SNiBB, and Buckaroos; played with Swedish folk rock artist Mikael Wiehe; and was the drummer for American country-punk band Jason & the Scorchers, when he decided to go in a classic hard rock direction with his next project.

The album Bonafide was recorded in his home studio together with bass player Micke Nilsson (Brickhouse, Mats Ronander), and caught the interest of former Sweden Rock Festival and Sweden Rock Records head Michael Ivarsson. After the addition of guitarist Mikael Fässberg (from original Iron Maiden singer Paul Di'Anno's touring band)  and drummer Sticky Bomb (real name Per-Åke Holmberg, from Kriminella Gitarrer, Wilmer X and Torsson), a revised version with a few new songs was released in October 2007.

Breakthrough 

The following year, 2008, saw the band playing two shows at the Sweden Rock Festival, one of them in place of former Skid Row singer Sebastian Bach, who cancelled his appearance at short notice. This exposed the band to a large audience and the debut album was re-released by new label, Sound Pollution, in 2009 with the addition of two songs taken from the festival performance, as well as the Nazareth song Miss Misery.

In January 2009, Bonafide started recording the follow-up album, Something's Dripping, with producer Chips Kiesbye (Sator, The Hellacopters, The Nomads, Sahara Hotnights), which upon release made it to the 16th position on the Swedish album charts. The album was followed by the band's first European tour, supporting all-female metal band Crucified Barbara, for 35 shows all over the continent.

Drummer Sticky Bomb was replaced for a tour of Spain in the spring of 2010 by Niklas Matsson (from Backdraft and Raging Slab), who became a permanent member later in the year. In September, the band recorded three cover tunes for a new EP: Fill Your Head With Rock – Old, New, Tried & True, which would also contain one previously unreleased song and two songs from their previous studio album, of which No Doubt About It was also featured on the soundtrack of the Atari racing game Test Drive Unlimited 2. The EP was released in January 2011  and topped the Swedish midprice charts. This was followed by a full European headline tour.

International 

Bonafide was featured in four consecutive issues of Classic Rock Magazine in the fall of 2011, gaining UK airplay  for Fill Your Head With Rock, which became the editor's choice for one of the best songs of the year, and the band's performances at the Hard Rock Hell festival became their UK breakthrough, being introduced on stage by designer, radio show host, and DJ, Steve 'Krusher' Joule.

Original bass player Micke Nilsson quit the band in the fall of 2011 and was replaced by Martin Ekelund (from Waterdog), who made his recording debut during 2012 on the third full-length album, Ultimate Rebel, recorded during February at Gig Studios in Stockholm with engineer Conny Wall (Electric Boys, Ane Brun, Imperial State Electric).

In February 2012, Snibb also released the Loud Feathers album with his new project Pontus Snibb 3, which also features drummer Niklas  and bass player Mats Rydström (from Backdraft and Raging Slab).

Current members
 Pontus Snibb – vocals, guitar (2007–present)
 Anders Rosell - guitar (2013–present)
 Martin Ekelund – bass (2011–present)
 Niklas Matsson – drums (2010–present)

Former members
 Sticky Bomb – drums (2007–2010)
 Micke Nilsson – bass (2007–2011)
 Mikael Fässberg – guitar (2007–2013)

Discography 

Studio albums
 Bonafide (2007, Sweden Rock Records)
 Something's Dripping (2009, Sound Pollution)
 Fill Your Head With Rock – Old, New, Tried & True EP (2011, Sound Pollution)
 Ultimate Rebel (2012, Rootsy/Off Yer Rocka)
 Bombo (2013, Off Yer Rocka)
 Denim Devils (2015, Off Yer Rocka)
 Flames (2017, Off Yer Rocka)

References

External links
 Official web page
 
 

Swedish rock music groups
Swedish heavy metal musical groups
Musical groups established in 2007